Taajwar Hakeem Latimore (born October 3, 1993), known professionally as Thouxanbanfauni, is an American rapper and record producer from Atlanta, Georgia.

Early life
In an interview with XXL, he mentioned that he grew up listening to artists OutKast, Andre 3000, Kendrick Lamar, Young Thug, Peewee Longway, Gucci Mane, Travis Porter, Roscoe Dash, Drake, Webbie and Boosie. He also recalls skateboarding when he was younger.

Career

2015-2016: Beginnings
In 2015, he released a collaborative project with fellow Atlanta rapper UnoTheActivist titled For Christ Sake.

2017-present
In January 2017, he released his Mixtape Heavyweight Champ. June 2018, he released his project Lost Files which included guest appearances from rappers Lucki, Ski Mask the Slump God, Famous Dex, UnoTheActivist and Lil Duke.  In February 2019, he released the sequel to his collaborative project with UnoTheActivist titled For Christ Sake 2 In December 2021, he released a project titled Forever Figora with guest appearances from UnoTheActivist, MDMA and LC Levi. In June 2022, he was featured on record producer Eva Shaw's single "Easterland" alongside fellow rapper Pressa.

Discography

Mixtapes

References

External links 
 

Living people
1995 births
American male rappers
Rappers from Atlanta